Ousmane Coulibaly (born 23 February 1969) is a Burkinabé footballer. He played in 28 matches for the Burkina Faso national football team from 1994 to 2001. He was also named in Burkina Faso's squad for the 1998 African Cup of Nations tournament.

References

External links
 
 

1969 births
Living people
Burkinabé footballers
Burkina Faso international footballers
1998 African Cup of Nations players
Place of birth missing (living people)
Association football defenders
21st-century Burkinabé people
RC Bobo Dioulasso players
Burkinabé football managers